Timothy Edward Irwin (born December 13, 1958) is a former American football offensive tackle. 
He played college football at Tennessee and played in the National Football League (NFL) for 14 years. Most of his professional career was with the Minnesota Vikings.

In 1990, he earned his law degree and was admitted to the Tennessee bar. In 2000, he opened his own law office in Knoxville, Tennessee, where he practiced in the field of criminal defense, juvenile justice, personal injury and sports law. In 2005, he was appointed Judge of the Juvenile Court for Knox County, along with former NFL linebacker Ron McCartney.

Irwin was also a co-founder of the Catholic Youth Football League in Knoxville. The league allows children who do not have a school team to play on a faith-based team and compete together against schools in the area.

Tim Irwin/Food City Bass Tournament
Since 1987, Irwin has sponsored the Tim Irwin/Food City Bass Tournament held in Lenoir City, Tennessee. Proceeds from the tournament benefit the Boys & Girls Clubs of the Tennessee Valley and has raised over $1 million since 1990. In recognition of his efforts, Irwin was inducted into the Boys & Girls Clubs of America Alumni Hall of Fame on May 14, 2009, in Atlanta, Georgia.

References

1958 births
Living people
American football offensive tackles
Miami Dolphins players
Minnesota Vikings players
Players of American football from Knoxville, Tennessee
Tampa Bay Buccaneers players
Tennessee Volunteers football players